Eliot Vassamillet (born 29 December 2000) is a Belgian singer who represented Belgium at the Eurovision Song Contest 2019 in Tel Aviv, Israel and failed to qualify for the grand final. He was selected internally with the song "Wake Up" written by Pierre Dumoulin, who previously wrote "City Lights" for singer Blanche, which placed 4th in Eurovision Song Contest 2017, and Vassamillet himself.

In 2018, he appeared on season 7 of The Voice Belgique, being coached by Slimane Nebchi.

The Voice Belgique
Eliot Vassamillet participated in the seventh season of The Voice Belgique, in the auditions he performed High Hopes prompting Slimane and Vitaa to turn. Vassamillet chose to be part of Slimane's team.

In the duels, Vassamillet was paired against Paak Kormongkolkul and they sang Mad World. Vassamillet won the duel and went through to the live shows while Kormongkolkul was stolen by Vitaa and continued in the show.

In the live shows, Vassamillet performed Alter Ego the public did not choose to send Vassamillet through to the final and he was not saved by his coach therefore Vassamillet left the show at this stage.

Eurovision Song Contest 2019
Following Israel's victory at Eurovision 2018 with its singer Netta, it was announced that the 2019 edition of the competition would be held in the city of Tel Aviv

On January 14, 2019 Télépro published an article rumouring that Eliot Vassamillet a student from Mons has been selected to represent Belgium in the competition 

The following day RTBF officially confirmed that Eliot Vassamillet would represent Belgium in the upcoming competition. It was announced that the song would be written by Pierre Demoulin the lead singer of Belgian rock group . Vassamillet stated that he and Demoulin wrote the song together. RTBF stated that the song wouldn't be revealed until February however, later that day ESCkaz reported that the song would be titled Wake Up

On February 28 2019, it is officially confirmed that Vassamillet will perform Wake Up in Tel Aviv.

At the contest he was drawn to perform in the first semi-final where he placed 13th with 70 points. As he did not place in the top ten he did not progress to the Grand Final of the competition marking the second time in a row that Belgium failed to qualify after Sennek placed 12th a year earlier.

Discography

Albums

Singles

References

Living people
21st-century Belgian male singers
21st-century Belgian singers
Eurovision Song Contest entrants of 2019
Eurovision Song Contest entrants for Belgium
2000 births